The Iran Fed Cup team represents Iran in Fed Cup tennis competition and are governed by the Tennis Federation of Iran. They currently compete in the Asia/Oceania Zone of Group II.

History
Iran competed in its first Fed Cup in 1972.

Current team
Farnaz Fasihi (Captain)
Sadaf Sadeghvaziri
Ghazal Pakbaten
Yasmin Mansouri
Sarah Amiri

Notable players
 Parvin Afshar
 Sadigheh Akbari
 Ghazaleh Torkaman

Tournaments

Results

Statistics
Since 1972(Last updated 30 August 2017)

Record
Champion: none
Runner-up: none
Lost in Semifinals: none
Lost in Quarterfinals: none
Lost in First Round: n times

Home and away record (all NN match-ups)
Performance at home (NN match-ups): NN–NN (NN.N%)
Performance away (NN match-ups): NN–NN (NN.N%)
Total: NN–NN (NN.N%)

Head-to-head record (1972–)

Asia and Oceania
 1-0
 0-3
 0-2
 0-1
 0-1
 1-1
 0-1
 0-1

 1-0
 1-1
 0-3
 0-2
 0-1
 0-2
 0-2
 0-1

Americas
 0-1

Results

See also
Fed Cup
Iran Davis Cup team

References

External links

Billie Jean King Cup teams
Fed Cup
Fed Cup